Chadwick, often shortened to Chad, is a masculine given name. Notable people with the name include:

 Chadwick Boseman (1976–2020), American actor
 Chadwick Russell (born 1999), Bahamian footballer 
 Chadwick A. Tolman (born 1938), American chemist
 Chadwick Tromp (born 1995), Aruban baseball player
 Chadwick Walton (born 1985), West Indies cricketer from Jamaica

See also
Chad (name)

English masculine given names